The 1911 Copa del Rey Final was the 10th final of the Spanish cup competition, the Copa del Rey. The final was played at Jolaseta Stadium in Getxo on 15 April 1911. The match was won by Athletic Bilbao, who beat CD Español 3–1. The Athletic goals were scored by Martyn Veitch, Luis Belaunde and Manuel Guernica and Federico Revuelto, with Antonio Neyra reducing the deficit for Vigo with 20 minutes remaining.

Details

References

External links
linguasport.com
RSSSF.com

1911
1910–11 in Spanish football
Athletic Bilbao matches
RCD Espanyol matches